The Battle of Zhongdu (present-day Beijing) was a battle in 1215 between the Mongols and the Jurchen Jin dynasty, which controlled northern China. The Mongols won and continued their conquest of China.

History
The year 1211 marked the beginning of the war between the Mongols and the Jin Dynasty. The Jin Dynasty was able to hold Genghis Khan (Temüjin) and his Mongol army at bay for the first two years of the war.

The Jurchen Jin emperor Wanyan Yongji's daughter, Jurchen Princess Qiguo was married to Mongol leader Genghis Khan in exchange for relieving the Mongol siege upon Zhongdu (Beijing) in the Mongol conquest of Jin China.
Throughout this time, however, Temüjin continued to build his forces and by 1213 had an army so powerful that it conquered all Jin territory up to the Great Wall of China. From this strategic location Temüjin made the decision to split his forces into three smaller armies in an attempt to break through the wall and finish his conquest of northern China. He sent his brother, Kasar, at the head of one of these armies east into Manchuria. He sent another army south toward Shanxi under command of his three oldest sons. He himself led the third army, along with his son Tuli, towards Shandong. The plan was a success, as all three armies broke through the wall in different places.

According to Ivar Lissner, the besieged inhabitants resorted to firing gold and silver cannon shot on the Mongols with their muzzle-loading cannons when their supply of metal for ammunition ran out.

The battle for Beijing was long and tiresome, but the Mongols proved to be more powerful as they finally took the city on 1 June 1215, massacring its inhabitants. This forced Jin Emperor Xuanzong to move his capital south to Kaifeng, and opened the Yellow River valley to further Mongol ravages. Kaifeng also fell to the Mongols after a siege in 1232.

See also
 History

References

Mongol conquest of Jin China
Zhongdu 1215
Zhongdu 1215
1215 in Asia
Zhongdu
Conflicts in 1215
1215 in the Mongol Empire